The Budawang Range, commonly called The Budawangs, a rugged mountain range within the Budawang National Park and the Morton National Park, are part of a spur off the Great Dividing Range and are located in the South Coast region of New South Wales, Australia.

Location and features
The Pigeon House Range forms the watershed between the northeast waters of Endrick River and those flowing north into the Shoalhaven River. A prominent range bearing west northwest forms the watershed separating the Endrick and Shoalhaven River systems.

The range defines part of the boundary between the New South Wales South Coast and the Southern Tablelands.

Much of the land within the range has been declared a wilderness area and are popular with bush walkers due to their terrain and unique features.

Mountain peaks
The Budawangs are generally considered to contain peaks located with the Budawang Range, the Pigeon House Range, the Currockbilly Range, and the Wirritin Range. The major recorded peaks are:

Mount Budawang
Currockbilly Mountain
Wog Wog Mountain
Mount Cole
Sturgiss Mountain
Fosters Mountain
Barneys Hill
The Castle
Shrouded Gods Mountain
Donjon Mountain
Quiltys Mountain
Wirritin Mountain
 Pigeon House Mountain / Didthul
Mount Bushwalker
Byangee Mountain
Mount Tarn

Other features
Other features within the range include the Monolith Valley, The Seven Gods Monoliths, Clyde River Valley, Hidden Valley, and Ettrema Gorge.

Land use history

Aboriginal use

The earliest human occupants of The Budawangs were two Aboriginal tribes; the Wandandians who inhabited land to the north of Pigeon House Mountain, and the Walbanjas who lived south of Pigeon House.

There are archaeological records of Aboriginal presence in the area dating back to around 11,000 years ago. Nearby coastal deposits have been dated at around 20,000 years old, so occupation in the Budawangs may well be older than current evidence suggests. Archaeological evidence found in the area includes occupational deposits in rock shelters, open campsites, and axe grinding grooves often found on rocks by the sides of creeks in the area. Art sites and rock arrangements also exist in the Budawangs though they are quite rare - the best of these is on Quilty's Mountain.

European land use
There are several grazing farmlands surrounding the national parks region both in the east and the west of the range. Logging began in the Budawang area in the early 1900s, it continues to this day in areas that remain outside of the national parks, such as state forests.

The Australian Army operated an artillery range on the Tianjara plateau between 1943 and 1974, also using the area for practice bombing and exercises often involving offroad vehicles. This area is highly damaged and littered with target debris and unexploded ordnance. If walking in or near this area, walker should take extreme care.

Access
As The Budawangs are only accessible from gravel roads, care should be taken after rain as the roads can become slippery.

The northern parts of the area including the Clyde River valley are best accessed from the Braidwood Nowra road. There are two entrances in the northern part of the park. One is near  and requires walking through farmland to the area around Quilty's Mountain. The other main northern entrance is a not very clearly marked gate on the side of the road near Sassafras.

Access to The Castle and Monolith Valley is best achieved from Long Gully just off the Western Distributor.

All three main entrances now have marked campsites and pit toilets. The Sassafrass campsite is approximately  down the fire trail from the carpark and has tank water and a sheltered picnic table. The Wog Wog campsite has no water. The Long Gully campsite is located adjacent to the Yadboro River.

Maps
If walking in The Budawangs a recommended resource is the Northern Budawang Range and the Upper Clyde River Valley sketch map, published by The Budawang Committee and available in most Sydney/Nowra/Canberra bushwalking stores. The sketch map was hand drawn and details many of the possible walks in the most popular part of the national park. The area is also covered by the 1:25,000 CMA maps CORANG (8927-3-N), ENDRICK (8927-4-S), TIANJARA (8927-1-S) and MILTON (8927-2-N).

See also

 List of mountains in New South Wales
 Protected areas of New South Wales

References 

Mountain ranges of New South Wales
Southern Tablelands
South Coast (New South Wales)